Mos Speedrun is an 8-bit retro-style game by British developer Physmo, released in April 2011 for iOS, October 2011 for PC, and January 2012 for Android.

Gameplay revolves around clearing levels and collecting coins as quickly as possible but forgoes the virtual d-pad typically used by iOS platformers in favor of a simplified two button control system.

Physmo later came out with a sequel, named Mos Speedrun 2.

References

External links
Developer website
Game website

2011 video games
Android (operating system) games
IOS games
Linux games
Platform games
Video games developed in the United Kingdom
Windows games